Petrol Group is a Slovenian oil distributing company, which is one of the largest in Slovenia and the former Yugoslavia and controls 500 petrol stations of which there are:
318 in Slovenia;
110 in Croatia;
42 in Bosnia and Herzegovina;                        
15 in Montenegro;
15 in Serbia.

History
The company was established in April 1947 as Jugopetrol, in the city of Ljubljana, and renamed to Petrol in 1953.

In 1974, trading in natural gas began. In 1996, the company was transformed into a joint-stock company under the name Petrol, Slovenska naftna družba, d.d. Ljubljana, and a year later the shares were listed on the Ljubljana Stock Exchange. In 1996, internationalization also began with the establishment of a subsidiary in Croatia, where the first service stations were built in 1999. The first stations in Bosnia and Herzegovina followed a year later, and in Serbia in 2003. 

In 2010, the Petrol Group acquired Croatian gas company Jadranplin, which focuses on gas storage and selling of liquefied petroleum gas.

References

External links
 

Oil and gas companies of Slovenia
Energy companies established in 1947
Non-renewable resource companies established in 1947
1947 establishments in Slovenia
Automotive fuel retailers